Virupakshiswarar Temple  is a Hindu temple located in Mylapore in Chennai, India. It is dedicated to Shiva.

Sapta Sthana Shiva temples
This temple is one of the Sapta Sthana Shiva temples in Mylapore area (one of the seven sacred Shiva temples in Mylapore). They are:

 Karaneeswarar Temple
 Tirttapaleeswarar Temple
 Velleeswarar Temple
 Virupakshiswarar Temple
 Valeeswarar Temple
 Malleeswarar Temple
 Kapaleeshwarar Temple

In addition to these "Sapta Sthana Shiva sthalas", the Ekambareshwarar–Valluvar temple in the neighbourhood is traditionally considered the indispensable eighth.

Presiding deity
The presiding deity is known as Virupakshiswarar. The goddess is known as Visalakshi. While Sundarar was worshipping the deity, as per his wish, the Lord blessed him with his Tandava of Nataraja.

Opening time
The temple located near Karaneeswarar Temple in Mylapore. It is opened for worship from 6.30 a.m. to 12.00 a.m and 4.30 p.m. to 8.00 p.m.

See also

 Religion in Chennai
 Heritage structures in Chennai

References

External links
 Dinamalar Temples, தினமலர் கோயில்கள்

Hindu temples in Chennai